A8ernA is a public space in Koog aan de Zaan, Zaanstad, the Netherlands. The urban renewal project cost €2,700,000 and was a Joint Winner of the 2006 European Prize for Urban Public Space.

Features
A8ernA makes use of the space under the A8 motorway bridge as it passes through Koog aan de Zaan.
It contains an area for teenagers consisting of a graffiti zone, a skateboarding park, a break dance stage,  ping-pong tables, a small football pitch, a basketball court and benches for couples.

Construction
The semi-spherical concavities in the skateboarding park were  built  using blocks of polystyrene cut to measure with a computer-controlled saw and coated with concrete.

References

External links

Parks in North Holland
Buildings and structures in North Holland